Tony Frangieh (September 22, 1987) is a Lebanese politician who serves as member of parliament since 2018. He is a member of the Marada Movement and the son of its leader, Suleiman Frangieh.

Early life and family 
Franjieh was born on September 22, 1987, in the town of Zgharta to the Maronite Christian Frangieh family. His father, Suleiman Frangieh Jr., is the head of the Marada Movement and was a former Lebanese MP. His biological mother is Marian Sarkis and has one brother and a half-sister. He holds a university degree in economics from the University of Balamand, and a master's degree in economics from the City University of London.

Career 
Tony Frangieh was born into a popular political family of the Zgharta region. He became involved in the field of politics and contributed to the management of the Marada movement headed by his father, Suleiman Franjieh, where he worked on many internal projects in the movement, including those concerned with youth, students, unions, education and other issues. He had an active presence and participation in many political and diplomatic meetings.

He also represented the movement on many occasions outside Lebanon, including Australia in 2012 and Venezuela in 2015 with the aim of meeting with the Lebanese community in these countries. He sponsored a large number of activities specialized in public affairs and social services, and participated in more than 5,000 activities across Lebanon.

Tony Frangieh is expected to succeed his father as party and family leader.

See also 

 Frangieh family
 Suleiman Frangieh (politician, born 1965)
 Marada Movement

References 

Living people
Lebanese politicians
Marada Movement politicians

1987 births
University of Balamand alumni
Frangieh family